Watching TV with the Red Chinese is a 2012 American comedy-drama film directed by Shimon Dotan, based on the 1992 novel of the same name by Luke Whisnant. The film follows a trio of Chinese exchange students who arrive in New York City in 1980, eager for what America has to offer. They make friends including a literature teacher named Dexter and his girlfriend Suzanne. As they try to adjust to the New York city atmosphere, they become disillusioned with America, eventually buying a firearm for self-defense.

Cast
 James Chen as Tzu
 Keong Sim as Wa
 Leonardo Nam as Chen 
 Gillian Jacobs as Suzanne
 Ryan O'Nan as Dexter Mitchell
 Michael Esper as Billy
 Peter Scanavino as Czapinczyk
 Idara Victor as Antigone

Reception
The film received positive reviews, with critics mostly praising the leads' performances and including minor critiques of the script.    Variety, for example, called the acting "solid, particularly by O'Nan, Nam and Jacobs. But the conversations feel artificial, overly concerned with re-creating period detail."  Daniel Gold of The New York Times adds that the film "nicely captures the grad-student vibe: beer-fueled bull sessions ... fragile, self-absorbed egos preening even as confidence wavers."  Paste Magazine states that "overall, the film rises above the usual trappings of low-budget productions and succeeds with a smart script and able performances from the cast of (mostly) unknowns, whether you're looking for sociopolitical commentary or just a small tale well told."

References

External links
 

2012 comedy-drama films
2012 independent films
2012 films
American comedy-drama films
American independent films
Chinese-language films
Films based on American novels
Films set in 1980
Films set in New York City
Films shot in New York City
2010s American films